Robert Bowles is an American Karate teacher and the founder of the International Shuri-ryū Association. Bowles is a member of the United States Karate Alliance Hall Of Fame. Robert Bowles, has studied martial arts for over 60 years. He attained a 10th Degree black belt in Shuri-ryū karate in a very short period of time and at an unusually young age, and is one of the late Robert Trias' eight Chief instructors of the Shuri-ryū system. He is the founder and director of the International Shuri-ryū Association. He began his karate training in Phoenix, Arizona under Robert Trias.  Karate began as a hobby which ultimately changed the direction of his life.  During the 1960s he trained in the Phoenix dojo which became his primary focus.  Local tournaments lead to national competitions and soon Bowles had established himself as one of the top competitors in the country. Bowles was a member of the first U.S. National Karate Association team that toured Europe, and in 1973 was the first competitor from the U.S. Karate Alliance Grand Nationals to win the triple crown – first place in Kata, Kumite and Weapons.  Trias personally awarded him the Trias International Award. However, karate was still relatively new in most parts of the country. Bowles was sent by Trias as an ambassador of Shuri-ryū to teach and promote Shuri-ryū across the country. Trias' daughter was the rightful successor to the organization upon the passing of Robert Trias. However, due to political strife within the group, Bowles splintered off and started his own organization

Competitions
In 1972, Bowles was a member of the first United States National Karate Association team to tour Europe. Since then he has represented the United States on seven different world tours visiting the following countries:  Korea, China, Hong Kong, Thailand, Taiwan, England, Germany, Scotland, France, Denmark, Norway, Sweden, Italy, Panama, and Venezuela. Bowles was the first person in the history of the United States Karate Alliance (USKA) Grand Nationals to win the Triple Crown: 1st place in Kata, Kumite and Weapons in 1973. With tournament championships spanning over 25 years, he has won the title of USKA World Champion six times.

References

External links
 The Journal Gazette Monday, April 04, 2016
 International Shuri-Ryu Association Homepage
  Robert Bowles Website

American male karateka
Shuri-ryū practitioners
Living people
Year of birth missing (living people)